This is a list of mayors of Saskatoon, the largest city in the central Canadian province of Saskatchewan. The mayor leads Saskatoon City Council, the city's governing body. The 28th and current mayor is Charlie Clark, who was first elected in 2016.

Background 
Saskatoon received a town charter in July 1903, which led to the inception of a town council. In May 1906 the Town of Saskatoon merged with the settlements of Riversdale and Nutana, and the City of Saskatoon was incorporated. Until 1954, Saskatoon's mayor was elected annually. From 1954 until 1970, the mayor was elected biannually. The term was then extended to three years, and in 2012 it was extended to four.

From 1920 to 1926 and from 1938 to 1942, Saskatoon mayors were elected using Instant-runoff voting. All other times First past the post was used.

Until 1976, mayor and council were sworn in during the first meeting of the new year, meaning that terms could be measured in calendar years. From 1976, mayor and council have been sworn in during the first meeting following the election.

List of mayors

See also 

 Saskatoon City Council

References

External links
 City of Saskatoon - History 

Saskatoon